Seven stones (also known by various other names) is a traditional game from the Indian subcontinent involving a ball and a pile of flat stones, generally played between two teams in a large outdoor area.

History
Seven Stones, one of the most ancient games of the Indian subcontinent whose history dates back to the Bhagwata Purana, a Hindu religious text that is claimed to be written 5000 years ago, which mentions Lord Krishna playing the game with his friends. This traditional sport has been played for the last 5 millennia. It is believed to have been originated in the southern parts of the Indian subcontinent.

Gameplay
A member of one team (the seekers) throws a ball at a pile of stones to knock them over. The seekers then try to restore the pile of stones while staying safe from the opposing team's (the hitters’) throws. The hitters' objective is to hit the seekers with the ball before they can reconstruct the stone pile. If the ball touches a seeker, that seeker is out and the team which the seeker came from continues, without the seeker. A seeker can always safeguard themselves by touching an opposite team member before the ball hits the seeker.

Additional rules
 The throwing seeker cannot come too close to the piled-up stones while attempting to knock them over. They have to do so from behind a line marked on the ground.
 If the person trying to knock down the pile cannot do it in three tries, they are considered out.
 If the thrower's ball does not knock down the pile and is caught by an opponent four times after the first bounce then the thrower is out.
 Each team contains an equal number of players.
 Piles of flat stones contain 7 or 10 stones.
 Hitters cannot run with the ball to hit the seekers.
 The seeker, after restoring the pile of stones, says the game's name to announce the reconstruction of the pile of stones.
If the ball is thrown by the thrower and hits the piles and the opposite member catch the ball then the whole team is out

Alternative names 

In other parts of India, the same game is known several other names:
 pithu garam  (Punjab)
 pithu garam  (Himachal) 
 Lagori (Karnataka)
 Lingoj (Telangana)
 Lingorcha, Lagori, Seven Tilo (Maharashtra) 
 Pitto, Pithu (Haryana, Uttarakhand, Uttar Pradesh, northern Rajasthan and West Bengal)
 Sitoliya (Rajasthan, Bihar, Madhya Pradesh)
 Satodiyu (Gujarat)
 Bam Pitto, pittu (Bihar)
 Yedu penkulata, Yedu rallu, dikori or pittu (Andhra Pradesh)
 Palli Patti (Karimnagar)
 Seventees / Dabba kali (Kerala, played using a ball made of coconut leaves"olapanthu") 
 Ezhu kallu (Tamil Nadu).
 Garmaan, Garam, Minto (Kashmir)
 Sat khapri (Jharkhand)
 Basketgoal (Odisha)

Similar to India, the game is identified differently in various countries, but the spirit of the sport remains the same. 
Haft Sang (Iran)
Sat Chara (Bangladesh)
Seven Stone / Game Ball (Nepal)
Pitho Garam, Pitthu Garam, Pitthu Gol Garam, Pittu Garam, Pittu Gol Garam (Pakistan)
Cantracon (Afghanistan)

Modern day 
Not very long ago, kids all around the country would come together on a field to play from a plethora of outdoor games. While football and cricket were the most commonly played games, ancient and traditional Indian were also played like Kabaddi, Kho-Kho, and Gilli Danda.

As time passed by, most of these traditional games began to fade away and very few remained. Kabaddi, for example, became a global phenomenon after being pushed with the Pro Kabaddi League. A game that no kid talked about 7 years ago, is now being enthusiastically watched and played by almost every child of this generation. Fortunately, Kabaddi is not the only traditional sport who gained international popularity. Lagori, which was played a lot by the youth back in the day, has also begun to make its way to the international circuit.

Today, Lagori is played by at least 30 nations across the world. The game has gradually gained a considerable amount of global prominence. However, India is the epicentre of the development of the game on with a bigger platform and a wide outreach to contemporary audience. The Indian Lagori Premier League that was held in November 2017 had gathered great momentum across the nation which was organised by the Amateur Lagori Federation of India. They have also made efforts to push the game to several states of India as well as in other countries, playing a pivotal role in popularising the game. The second Lagori World Cup (first being played in 2015) is soon going to take place later this year, several nations including Indian, Bhutan Hong Kong, Brazil, Turket, Sri Lanka, Bangladesh, and Nepal will go face to face.

The rules have not changed that much over the years, however there have been some changes brought in the way the game is being played. The following fundamentals were laid down by the International Lagori Foundation: Each team would have 12 players, with only 6 players on the court for every set. One set lasts for 3 minutes followed by a half minute break in between sets. One match has typically 3 sets and the team scoring maximum points wins. Other than that, the rules are basically the same for all leagues. Having said that, the game has definitely come a long way from what it was. From a dusty open field to an indoor synthetic turf, from a pile of stones lying around in the field to 7 circular fibre discs made for the game, and from an old tennis ball to a softball specifically tailored for the game.

Despite the game almost being forgotten and becoming extinct in the past few decades, the inaugural World Cup help in 2015 was a huge success paired with the Indian Lagori Premiere League (ILPL) catering to a wide audience in the country, it seems as though Lagori is going through its revival phase.

In popular media
 In the grand season finale of TVF Triplings, a popular Indian mini internet series made by TVF (The Viral Fever), a game of SPL (Sitoliya Pitto Lagori) acts as the glue that brings together a group of estranged siblings.

See also 

 Kho kho
 Kabaddi

References

External links 

 Indian games
 About Lagori: Topend Sports Website

Sports originating in India
Team sports
Traditional sports of India
Ball games
Sport in Karnataka
Culture of Karnataka
Indian games
Articles containing video clips